During Labor Day Weekend, Drum Corps Associates (DCA) Open Class corps compete to earn the title of DCA Open Class World Champion. The championships consist of 2 rounds (Prelims and Finals) held on 2 consecutive nights (the Saturday and Sunday nights of Labor Day weekend).  All corps compete at Prelims, with the top 10 Open Class and top 4 Class A corps competing at Finals.  The champion is determined by the overall high score in the Finals competition.  There are also a number of caption awards (high brass, high percussion, high visual, etc.), though the process of determination for those awards has changed from year to year.

Only eleven corps have won at least one DCA title (including 2 ties):
Reading Buccaneers – 17 titles
Hawthorne Caballeros – 10 titles
Bushwackers – 6 titles (1 tie)
Long Island Sunrisers – 6 titles (1 tie)
Empire Statesmen – 5 titles (1 tie)
Syracuse Brigadiers – 5 titles (1 tie)
Connecticut Hurricanes – 3 titles
Skyliners – 3 titles
Minnesota Brass – 1 title
Westshoremen – 1 title
Cadets2 – 1 title

As of the conclusion of the 2019 competitive season, the Buccaneers, Bushwackers, Caballeros, Hurricanes, Skyliners, and Sunrisers remain in active Open Class competition.  The Cadets2, Minnesota Brass, Brigadiers, Empire Statesmen, and Westshoremen are inactive.

1965 
Champion: Reading Buccaneers of Reading, Pennsylvania
Repertoire:
Burke's Law
From This Moment On
Portrait of My Love
Maria
This Had Better Be The Night
El Cid
After You've Gone
Beyond the Sea
Score: 84.50
Location: Milford, Connecticut
Venue: Jonathan Law Field
Date: September 11

1966 
Champion: New York Skyliners of New York, NY
Repertoire:
Charlie Welch (from Mr. Wonderful)
Columbia the Gem of the Ocean (from Thousands Cheer)
That Old Black Magic (from Bus Stop)
Flight of the Bumblebee
Once in Love with Amy (from Where's Charley?)
Hava Nagila
Oklahoma (from Oklahoma!)
Score: 84.53
Location: Bridgeport, Connecticut
Venue: JFK Stadium
Date: September 4

1967 
Champion: Connecticut Hurricanes of Derby, Connecticut
Repertoire:
You Gotta Start Off Each Day With A Song
Just One Of Those Songs
Under the Double Eagle
National Emblem March
America I Love You
Rhapsody in Blue
Fiddler On the Roof
Return Of The Magnificent Seven
Score: 85.583
Location: Bridgeport, Connecticut
Venue: JFK Stadium
Date: September 3

1968 
Champion: Reading Buccaneers of Reading, Pennsylvania
Repertoire: Unavailable
Score: 82.15
Location: Rochester, New York
Venue: Aquinas Stadium
Date: September 1

1969 
Champion: Connecticut Hurricanes of Derby, Connecticut
Repertoire:
Queen of Sheba March
Hallelujah Chorus
Rhapsody in Blue
Walk on the Wild Side
Hang 'Em High
Magnificent Seven
Also Sprach Zarathustra (from 2001: A Space Odyssey)
Score: 79.745
Location: Rochester, New York
Venue: Aquinas Stadium
Date: August 31

1970 
Champion: Hawthorne Caballeros of Hawthorne, New Jersey
Repertoire:
Captain From Castile
Ted Meets Johnny
Sabre Dance
1812 Overture
Samba de Orpheo
Score: 82.775
Location: Rochester, New York
Venue: Aquinas Stadium
Date: September 6

1971 
Champion: New York Skyliners of New York, NY
Repertoire:
NY Montage
Little Old New York (from Tenderloin)
Longest Day
Alabama Jubilee
Lucretia McEvil
Comes Love
Slaughter on 10th Avenue (from On Your Toes)
Little Old New York (from Tenderloin)
East Side-West Side Fanfare
Score: 91.5
Location: Rochester, New York
Venue: Aquinas Stadium
Date: September 5

1972 
Champion: Hawthorne Caballeros of Hawthorne, New Jersey
Repertoire:
El Gato Montes
Captain From Castile
Theme from Patton
Everybody's Everything
Sabre Dance
Flamenco Cha-Cha
Samba de Orpheo
Score: 90.6
Location: Jersey City, New Jersey
Venue: Roosevelt Stadium
Date: September 3

1973 
Champion: Hawthorne Caballeros of Hawthorne, New Jersey
Repertoire:
Man of La Mancha
South Rampart Street Parade
Everybody's Everything
Sabre Dance
Flamenco Cha-Cha
Harmonica Man
Score: 89.85
Location: Rochester, New York
Venue: Aquinas Stadium
Date: September 2

1974 
Champion: Hawthorne Caballeros of Hawthorne, New Jersey
Repertoire:
Man of La Mancha
Sweet Gypsy Rose
Soul Train
Mac Arthur Park
Flamenco Cha-Cha
Harmonica Man
Score: 83.5
Location: Rochester, New York
Venue: Aquinas Stadium
Date: September 1

1975 
Champion: New York Skyliners of New York, NY
Repertoire:
How Could You Believe Me When I Said I Loved You
Hymn to Victory (from Victory at Sea)
West Side Story Medley
The Elks' Parade
Give My Regards to Broadway (from Yankee Doodle Dandy)
East Side-West Side Fanfare
Score: 91.28
Location: Rochester, New York
Venue: Holleder Memorial Stadium
Date: August 31

1976 
Champion: Hawthorne Caballeros of Hawthorne, New Jersey
Repertoire:
Bully
Brazil (from The Gang's All Here)
Echano (from Children of Sanchez)
Flamenco Cha-Cha
Hill Where the Lord Hides
Score: 92.5
Location: Rochester, New York
Venue: Holleder Memorial Stadium
Date: September 5

1977 
Champion: Long Island Sunrisers of Long Island, New York
Repertoire:
English Folk Song Suite by Ralph Vaughan Williams
Spain
Ol' Man River (from Show Boat) by Jerome Kern
Eli's Coming by Hoyt Axton
Dance Of The Wind-Up Toys (drum solo) by Chuck Mangione
Evergreen (from A Star is Born) by Paul Williams
Score: 94.15
Location: Allentown, Pennsylvania
Venue: J. Birney Crum Stadium
Date: September 3

1978 
Champion: Long Island Sunrisers of Rockland County, New York
Repertoire:
English Folk Song Suite by Ralph Vaughan Williams
Malaga by Bill Holman (musician)
Farandole by Bizet, Georges
Evergreen (from A Star is Born) by Williams, Paul
Score: 90.85
Location: Allentown, Pennsylvania
Venue: J. Birney Crum Stadium
Date: September 3

1979 
Champion: Reading Buccaneers of Reading, Pennsylvania
Repertoire:
Russian Sailor's Dance (from The Red Poppy) by Gliere, Reinhold
Fantasy by Earth, Wind and Fire
El Gato Triste by Mangione, Chuck
Feels So Good by Mangione, Chuck
Sylvia by Dilibes
Score: 90.5
Location: Hershey, Pennsylvania
Venue: Hershey Park Stadium
Date: September 2

1980 
Champion: Reading Buccaneers of Reading, Pennsylvania
Repertoire:
The Sea Hawk by Korngold, Erik Wolfgang
Russian Sailor's Dance (from The Red Poppy) by Gliere, Reinhold
Spanish Dreams by Severinsen, Doc
Sambandrea Swing by Menza, Don
One Voice by Manilow, Barry
Sylvia by Dilibes
Score: 91.3
Location: Hershey, Pennsylvania
Venue: Hershey Park Stadium
Date: August 31

1981 
Champion: Connecticut Hurricanes of Derby, Connecticut
Repertoire:
Queen of Sheba March by Respighi, Ottorino
Swing, Swing, Swing (from 1941) by Williams, John
Salute to Freedom by Statham, Frank
Devil Went Down to Georgia by Daniels, Charlie
It's My Turn by Sondheim, Stephen
Magnificent Seven by Bernstein, Elmer
Score: 89.65
Location: Philadelphia, Pennsylvania
Venue: Franklin Field
Date: September 6

1982 
Champion: Long Island Sunrisers of Rockland County, New York
Repertoire:
God Save the Queen by Ives, Charles
English Suite for Military Band by Vaughan Williams, Ralph
Barnum's Revenge by Coleman, Cy
Tiger of San Pedro by La Barbera, John
Legend of the One-Eyed Sailor by Mangione, Chuck
Send in the Clowns (from A Little Night Music) by Sondheim, Stephen
Come Follow the Band (from Barnum) by Coleman, Cy
Score: 89.85
Location: Allentown, Pennsylvania
Venue: J. Birney Crum Stadium
Date: September 5

1983 
Champion: Long Island Sunrisers of Rockland County, New York
Repertoire:
Russian Meadowlands by Knipper, Lev
Alexander's Ragtime Band by Berlin, Irving
Legend of the One-Eyed Sailor by Mangione, Chuck
Peasant Dance by Hirschberg, David
Send in the Clowns (from A Little Night Music) by Sondheim, Stephen
Come Follow the Band (from Barnum) by Coleman, Cy
Score: 91.45
Location: Allentown, Pennsylvania
Venue: J. Birney Crum Stadium
Date: September 4

1984 
Champion: Hawthorne Caballeros of Hawthorne, New Jersey
Repertoire:
Concierto de Aranjuez by Rodrigo, Joaquin
Nothing But D. Best by Best, Denzel de Costa
Malaguena by Lecuona, Ernesto
Don't Cry for Me Argentina (from Evita)
Score: 92.4
Location: Allentown, Pennsylvania
Venue: J. Birney Crum Stadium
Date: September 3

1985 
Champion: Hawthorne Caballeros of Hawthorne, New Jersey
Repertoire:
Corre Nina by Purim, Flora
Upstart by Ellis, Don
Malaguena by Lecuona, Ernesto
L.A. Is My Lady by Jones, Quincy
Espana Cani by Marquina, Narro Pascual
Score: 92.5
Location: Allentown, Pennsylvania
Venue: J. Birney Crum Stadium
Date: September 1

1986 
Champion: Bushwackers of Harrison, New Jersey
Repertoire:
Santos by Bellson, Louis
Quensabe Los Suertas de Los Tontos (from Cuban Fire Suite) by Richards, Johnny
La Suerte de Los Tontos (from Cuban Fire Suite) by Richards, Johnny
Egyptian Danza by Di Meola, Al
Ayres Eyes
Score: 92.45
Location: Allentown, Pennsylvania
Venue: J. Birney Crum Stadium
Date: August 31

1987 
This championships were noted by rain so severe during Prelims that Final were cancelled (due to extensive damage to the grass field) and the standing Prelims stood as the Finals results
Champion: Long Island Sunrisers of Rockland County, New York
Repertoire:
Adventures on Earth (from E.T.) by Williams, John
Jupiter (from The Planets) by Holst, Gustav
Score: 94.84
Location: Allentown, Pennsylvania
Venue: J. Birney Crum Stadium
Date: September 6

1988 
Champion: Bushwackers of Harrison, New Jersey / Long Island Sunrisers of Rockland County, New York
Bushwackers Repertoire:
Pellet Suite by McDougal, Ian
Inner Crisis by Willis, Larry
Mira, Mira by Ferguson, Maynard
Out of Africa (from Congo) by Bergman, Marilyn
Sunrisers Repertoire:
Savannah River Holiday by Nelson, Ron
Concerto in F by Gershwin, George
An American in Paris by Gershwin, George
Score: 96.36
Location: Hershey, Pennsylvania
Venue: Unavailable
Date: September 5

1989 
Champion: Bushwackers of Harrison, New Jersey
Repertoire:
Time Check by Menza, Donald
In Her Family by Metheny, Pat
No Pasaran by Schanzer, Jeffrey
Mira, Mira by Ferguson, Maynard
Score: 95.1
Location: Allentown, Pennsylvania
Venue: J. Birney Crum Stadium
Date: September 3
There was actually a tie with the Sunrisers both had a score of 95.00 and Bush was given an extra .1 due to caption placements.

1990 
Champion: Bushwackers of Harrison, New Jersey
Repertoire:
Prototype by Stephen Melilo
Score: 96.9
Location: Allentown, Pennsylvania
Venue: J. Birney Crum Stadium
Date: September 2

1991 
Champion: Empire Statesmen of Rochester, New York
Repertoire:
Begin the Beguine (from Night and Day) by Porter, Cole
Sophisticated Lady by Ellington, Duke
American Patrol by Miller, Glenn
Don't Sit Under The Apple Tree by Miller, Glenn
In the Mood by Miller, Glenn
America the Beautiful by Ward, Samuel A.
Battle Hymn of the Republic by Steffe, William
Score: 96.7
Location: Scranton, Pennsylvania
Venue: Lackawanna County Stadium
Date: September 1

1992 
Champion: Bushwackers of Harrison, New Jersey
Repertoire:
The Ballad of Sweeney Todd) by Sondheim, Stephen
My Friends (from Sweeney Todd) by Sondheim, Stephen
Worst Pies in London (from Sweeney Todd) by Sondheim, Stephen
History of the World
Epiphany (from Sweeney Todd) by Sondheim, Stephen
Nothin's Gonna Harm You (from Sweeney Todd) by Sondheim, Stephen
Score: 96.7
Location: Scranton, Pennsylvania
Venue: Lackawanna County Stadium
Date: September 6

1993 
Champion: Bushwackers of Harrison, New Jersey
Repertoire:
Sunday in the Park with George
Putting It Together (from Sunday in the Park with George) by Sondheim, Stephen
Color and Light (from Sunday in the Park with George) by Sondheim, Stephen
Sunday in the Park (from Sunday in the Park with George) by Sondheim, Stephen
Sunday by Sondheim, Stephen
Score: 96.6
Location: Scranton, Pennsylvania
Venue: Lackawanna County Stadium
Date: September 6

1994 
Champion: Empire Statesmen of Rochester, New York
Repertoire:
The Music of Frank Sinatra
Ol' Man River (from Show Boat) by Kern, Jerome
I've Got the World on a String (from I'll Get By) by Arlen, Harold
April in Paris (from The Helen Morgan Story) by Duke, Vernon
My Way by Anka, Paul
Score: 96.0
Location: Scranton, Pennsylvania
Venue: Lackawanna County Stadium
Date: September 3

1995 
Champion: Hawthorne Caballeros of Hawthorne, New Jersey
Repertoire:
Spanish Fantasies
Malaguena by Lecuona, Ernesto
Conquistador by Chattaway, Jay
Spanish Fantasy by Corea, Chick
Concierto de Aranjuez by Rodrigo, Joaquin
Espana Cani by Marquina, Narro Pascual
Score: 97.7
Location: Scranton, Pennsylvania
Venue: Lackawanna County Stadium
Date: September 3

1996 
Champion: Westshoremen of Harrisburg, Pennsylvania
Repertoire:
Suite for Westshore
Granada Smoothie
All the Things You Are
Explosion!
Marching Season
Carnival (from La Fiesta Mexicana)
Suite for Jazz Orchestra
Blues in the Night
Score: 96.9
Location: Rochester, New York
Venue: Frontier Field
Date: September 1

1997 
Champion: Empire Statesmen of Rochester, New York / Syracuse Brigadiers of Syracuse, New York
Empire Repertoire:
Miss Saigon
Overture
Heat is On in Saigon
Sun and Moon
Dragon
Fall of Saigon
Brigadiers Repertoire:
Night and Day: A Tribute to Cole Porter
In the Still of the Night (from Night and Day)
Love for Sale (from Night and Day)
Night and Day
It's Alright With Me (from Can-Can)
Score: 96.3
Location: Allentown, Pennsylvania
Venue: J. Birney Crum Stadium
Date: August 31

1998 
Champion: Empire Statesmen of Rochester, New York
Repertoire:
West Side Story
Fanfare
The Jets
Maria
America
Cool
The Rumble
Somewhere
Score: 97.9
Location: Allentown, Pennsylvania
Venue: J. Birney Crum Stadium
Date: September 6

1999 
Champion: Syracuse Brigadiers of Syracuse, New York
Repertoire:
On the Town with Buddy and Mel
Channel One Suite by Reddie, Bill
Harlem Nocturne by Hagen, Earl
Mercy Mercy Mercy by Ochs, Michael
Score: 97.5
Location: Allentown, Pennsylvania
Venue: J. Birney Crum Stadium
Date: September 5

2000 
Champion: Syracuse Brigadiers of Syracuse, New York
Repertoire:
City Rhythms
Slaughter on 10th Avenue (from On Your Toes) by Rodgers, Richard
Ballet in Brass by Brown, Les; Schoen, Victor
Artistry in Rhythm by Kenton, Stan
Harlem Nocturne by Hagen, Earle
Score: 98.0
Location: Syracuse, New York
Venue: P & C Stadium
Date: September 3

2001 
Champion: Syracuse Brigadiers of Syracuse, New York
Repertoire:
Jazz Street, After Hours
Seven Year Itch by Newman, Alfred
Come Back to Me (from On A Clear Day You Can See Forever) by Lane, Burton
God Bless the Child by Herzog, Jr., Arthur; Holiday, Billy
Mac Arthur Park by Webb, Jimmy
Score: 97.95
Location: Syracuse, New York
Venue: P & C Stadium
Date: September 2

2002 
Champion: Syracuse Brigadiers of Syracuse, New York
Repertoire:
Picasso Sketchbook
Spanish Fantasy by Corea, Chick
Day Danse by Corea, Chick
Guaganco by Sandoval, Arturo
All Or Nothing At All by Porter, Cole
Score: 98.6
Location: Scranton, Pennsylvania
Venue: Lackawanna County Stadium
Date: September 1

2003 
Champion: Hawthorne Caballeros of Hawthorne, New Jersey
Repertoire:
El Toro Nuevo
El Toro Rojo by Poulan, Key
The Prayer by Bayer, Carol; Foster, David
El Toro Furioso by Poulan, Key
Score: 97.375
Location: Scranton, Pennsylvania
Venue: Lackawanna County Stadium
Date: August 31

2004 
Champion: Empire Statesmen of Rochester, New York
Repertoire:
Go Hollywood!
Prologue and Theme (from City of Angels) by Coleman, Cy
With Every Breath I Take (from City of Angels)
Funny (from City of Angels)
Score: 96.513
Location: Scranton, Pennsylvania
Venue: Lackawanna County Stadium
Date: September 5

2005 
Champion: Reading Buccaneers of Reading, Pennsylvania
Repertoire:
Variations in "B" – Music by Barber, Bartók, Bizet, and Britten
Farandole
Adagio for Strings
String Quartet #5 – Movement 4
A Young Person's Guide to the Orchestra
Score: 98.45
Location: Scranton, Pennsylvania
Venue: Lackawanna County Stadium
Date: September 4

2006 
Champion: Reading Buccaneers of Reading, Pennsylvania
Repertoire:
Exotic Impressions
Bolero
Capriccio Espagnol
Claire de Lune
Scheherazade
Score: 97.238
Location: Rochester, New York
Venue: PAETEC Park
Date: September 3

2007 
Champion: Reading Buccaneers of Reading, Pennsylvania
Repertoire:
Blue Era
New Era Dance
The Promise of Living
Malambo
Rhapsody in Blue
Score: 98.313
Location: Rochester, New York
Venue: PAETEC Park
Date: September 2

2008 
Champion: Reading Buccaneers of Reading, Pennsylvania
Repertoire:
The Pursuit of Joy
Canon in D
Abram's Pursuit
Nessun Dorma
Ode to Joy
Score: 97.913
Location: Rochester, New York
Venue: PAETEC Park
Date: August 31

2009 
Champion: Reading Buccaneers of Reading, Pennsylvania
Repertoire:
Demons & Angels
Dies Irae
A Simple Song
Ritual Fire Dance
Symphonia Resurrectus
Score: 99.025
Location: Rochester, New York
Venue: PAETEC Park
Date: September 6

2010 
Champion: Reading Buccaneers of Reading, Pennsylvania
Repertoire:
Rome MMX
Pines of the Appian Way (fourth Movement from Pines of Rome)
Games at the Circus Maximus (Movement I from Roman Festivals)
Adagio from Spartacus
The Epiphany (Movement IV from Roman Festivals)
Score: 98.263
Location: Rochester, New York
Venue: PAETEC Park
Date: September 6

2011 
Champion: Minnesota Brass of St. Paul, Minnesota
Repertoire:
Valhalla
Immigrant Song by Led Zeppelin
Children's Hour of Dream by Charles Mingus
Imagine by John Lennon
Ride of the Valkyries by Richard Wagner
Score: 98.35
Location: Rochester, New York
Venue: Sahlen's Stadium
Date: September 4

2012 
Champion: Reading Buccaneers of Reading, Pennsylvania
Repertoire:
The Black Symphony
Warm Colors by Mark Lortz
The Four Sections for Orchestra, Mvt. IV by Steve Reich
New World (from Dancer in the Dark) by Björk
1812 Overture by Pyotr Ilyich Tchaikovsky
Score: 99.03
Location: Annapolis, Maryland
Venue: Navy–Marine Corps Memorial Stadium
Date: September 2

2013 
Champion: Reading Buccaneers of Reading, Pennsylvania
Repertoire:
Higher, Faster, Stronger
Symphony No. 11, Mvt IV by Dmitri Shostakovich
Original Composition by Mark Lortz
Chevaliers de Sangreal (from the film The Da Vinci Code) by Hans Zimmer
Danse Bacchanale (from the opera Samson and Delilah) by Camille Saint-Saëns
Score: 98.43
Location: Annapolis, Maryland
Venue: Navy–Marine Corps Memorial Stadium
Date: September 1

2014 
Champion: Reading Buccaneers of Reading, Pennsylvania
Repertoire:
Break On Through
Break On Through (To the Other Side) by The Doors
Fourth Ballet Suite by Dmitri Shostakovich
Orawa for String Orchestra by Wojciech Kilar
Heat of the Day by Pat Metheny
Original Composition by Mark Lortz, Johnny Trujillo, and Greg Tsalikis
Score: 97.55
Location: Rochester, New York
Venue: Sahlen's Stadium
Date: August 31

2015 
Champion: Reading Buccaneers of Reading, Pennsylvania
Repertoire:
Twist It
Pagliacci by Ruggero Leoncavallo
Palladio by Karl Jenkins
Moonlight Sonata by Ludwig van Beethoven
Going the Distance (from Rocky) by Bill Conti
William Tell Overture by Gioachino Rossini
Score: 97.58
Location: Rochester, New York
Venue: Sahlen's Stadium
Date: Sep 7

2016 
Champion: Cadets2 of Allentown, Pennsylvania
Repertoire:
Full Circle
The Heat of the Day by Pat Matheny
First Circle by Pat Matheny
Third Wind by Pat Matheny
Both Sides Now by Joni Mitchell
Score: 97.95
Location: Rochester, NY
Venue: Capelli Sport Stadium
Date: Sep 4

2017 
Champion: Reading Buccaneers of Reading, Pennsylvania
Repertoire:
Behind the Suit
Score: 98.93
Location: Rochester, NY
Venue: Capelli Sport Stadium
Date: Sep 3

2018 
Champion: Reading Buccaneers of Reading, Pennsylvania
Repertoire:
Here to There
Score: 98.00
Location: Williamsport, PA
Venue: STA Stadium
Date: Sep 2

2019 
Champion: Reading Buccaneers of Reading, Pennsylvania
Repertoire: 
Dans Ma Chambre
"Benedictus" by Karl Jenkins
"Ruslan and Lyudmila Overture" by Mikhail Glinka
"Flashdance What a Feeling" by Irene Crane
"Bohemian Rhapsody" by Queen
Score: 98.225
Location: Williamsport, PA
Venue: STA Stadium
Date: Aug 31 (Prelims & Finals)

References

External links 
 Drum Corps Score Archive
 Drum Corps Repertoire Database

Drum and bugle corps